The 2023 European Amateur Team Championship takes place 11–15 July at the Royal Waterloo Golf Club in Lasne, Belgium. It will be the 40th men's golf European Amateur Team Championship.

Defending champion is team Spain.

Venue 
The hosting club was founded in 1923 by Rodolphe Seeldrayers. The Marache Course was designed by architect Fred Hawtree  and established in 1961 in Ohain, Lasne, in the region of Wallon Brabant, close to the historic Waterloo battlefield, 20 kilometres south-east of the city center of Brussels, Belgium. The greens were renovated by Martin Hawtree, son of Fred Hawree, 2004–2005.

Format 
Each team consists of six players. On the first two days each player plays 18 holes of stroke play each day. The lowest five scores from each team’s six players counts to the team total each day.

The eight best teams form flight A, in knock-out match-play over the following three days. The teams are seeded based on their positions after the stroke play. The first placed team is drawn to play the quarter final against the eight placed team, the second against the seventh, the third against the sixth and the fourth against the fifth. Teams are allowed to use six players during the team matches, selecting four of them in the two morning foursome games and five players in to the afternoon single games. Teams knocked out after the quarter finals play one foursome game and four single games in each of their remaining matches. Extra holes are played in games that are all square after 18 holes. However, if the result of the team match is already decided, games are declared halved.

The teams outside the top eight in the stroke-play stage forms flight B, also play knock-out match-play, but with one foursome game and four single games in each match, to decide their final positions.

Teams 
16 nation teams contest the event. Qualified are the top 13 teams from the 2022 European Amateur Team Championship, the host nation team Belgium and the two top teams from the 2022 European Amateur team Championship Division 2. Each team consists of six players.

Qualified teams

See also
Eisenhower Trophy – biennial world amateur team golf championship for men organized by the International Golf Federation.
European Amateur Championship – European amateur individual golf championship for men organised by the European Golf Association.
European Ladies' Team Championship – European amateur team golf championship for women organised by the European Golf Association.

References

External links 
European Golf Association: 2023 Events

European Amateur Team Championship
Golf tournaments in Belgium
European Amateur Team Championship
European Amateur Team Championship
European Amateur Team Championship